In general topology and related areas of mathematics, the disjoint union (also called the  direct sum, free union, free sum, topological sum, or coproduct) of a family of topological spaces is a space formed by equipping the disjoint union of the underlying sets with a natural topology called the disjoint union topology. Roughly speaking, in the disjoint union the given spaces are considered as part of a single new space where each looks as it would alone and they are isolated from each other.

The name coproduct originates from the fact that the disjoint union is the categorical dual of the product space construction.

Definition
Let {Xi : i ∈ I} be a family of topological spaces indexed by I. Let

be the disjoint union of the underlying sets. For each i in I, let

be the canonical injection (defined by ). The disjoint union topology on X is defined as the finest topology on X for which all the canonical injections  are continuous (i.e.: it is the final topology on X induced by the canonical injections).

Explicitly, the disjoint union topology can be described as follows. A subset U of X is open in X if and only if its preimage  is open in Xi for each i ∈ I. Yet another formulation is that a subset V of X is open relative to X iff its intersection with Xi is open relative to Xi for each i.

Properties
The disjoint union space X, together with the canonical injections, can be characterized by the following universal property: If Y is a topological space, and fi : Xi → Y is a continuous map for each i ∈ I, then there exists precisely one continuous map f : X → Y such that the following set of diagrams commute:

This shows that the disjoint union is the coproduct in the category of topological spaces. It follows from the above universal property that a map f : X → Y is continuous iff fi = f o φi is continuous for all i in I.

In addition to being continuous, the canonical injections φi : Xi → X are open and closed maps. It follows that the injections are topological embeddings so that each Xi may be canonically thought of as a subspace of X.

Examples
If each Xi is homeomorphic to a fixed space A, then the disjoint union X is homeomorphic to the product space A × I where I has the discrete topology.

Preservation of topological properties
 Every disjoint union of discrete spaces is discrete
Separation
 Every disjoint union of T0 spaces is T0
 Every disjoint union of T1 spaces is T1
 Every disjoint union of Hausdorff spaces is Hausdorff
Connectedness
 The disjoint union of two or more nonempty topological spaces is disconnected

See also
 product topology, the dual construction
 subspace topology and its dual quotient topology
 topological union, a generalization to the case where the pieces are not disjoint

General topology